This Is England is a British film and TV series.

Installments
 This Is England – Feature film released on 27 April 2007
 This Is England '86 – Four episodes broadcast between 7 and 28 September 2010
 This Is England '88 – Three episodes broadcast between 13 and 15 December 2011
 This Is England '90 – Four episodes broadcast between 13 September and 4 October 2015

Recurring cast

See also
 List of film series with four entries

References

British film series
Drama film series
Films set in England
This Is England
2000s English-language films